Coralie Rose is an English film and television actress.

She first appeared on television as a support role on BBC1's Holby City in 2003, before taking an occasional role in ITV1's Night & Day in 2004. In the same year, she appeared in the "Dove Beauties" advert series for Dove soap. Since this time she has appeared in Waking the Dead, Hollyoaks and Doctors. She also starred in the film Rise of the Footsoldier, and had a part in the 2009 revival of The Prisoner.

References

External links
Personal blog

Year of birth missing (living people)
Living people
English people of Belgian descent
Actresses from London